Oxford Airport is a privately owned airport in Oxford, England.

Oxford Airport may also refer to:
Waterbury–Oxford Airport, an airport in Oxford, Connecticut
University-Oxford Airport, an airport in Oxford, Mississippi
Oxford House Airport, an airport in Oxford House, Manitoba
Oxford Airport (Massachusetts), a defunct airport in Oxford, Massachusetts
Henderson–Oxford Airport, an airport in Oxford, North Carolina